Thomas Malcolm (1861 – 29 October 1897) was a New Zealand cricketer. He played in one first-class match for Wellington in 1885/86.

See also
 List of Wellington representative cricketers

References

External links
 

1861 births
1897 deaths
New Zealand cricketers
Wellington cricketers